St Swithun's Church is the smallest ancient Church of England parish church in the English county of Hampshire. Newnham and Nately Scures are part of the Anglican United Parish which includes: Greywell, Mapledurwell and Up Nately, which in turn are covenanted with a further seven churches in the area.

History

The Church was built of flint and rubble around 1175. It is considered to be the best largely unspoilt example of a Norman single-cell apsidal church in England. There are only four examples remaining in the UK. A gallery was installed in 1591 and rebuilt together with the roof in 1786. Binstead stone forms the door and window dressings.

Services
Services normally take place in each of the churches within the United Parish including St Swithun's twice per month. The church is never locked by day.

Burials
 General The 1st Baron Dorchester
 Colonel Thomas Carleton
 Lieutenant-General Sir Christopher Wallace 
 Violet Edith Potter

External links
 St Swithun's Church Nately Scures England - Showing Memorial for Guy Carleton, Governor of Quebec, and Thomas Carleton, Governor of New Brunswick

Buildings and structures completed in 1175
12th-century church buildings in England
Church of England church buildings in Hampshire
Churches with Norman architecture
Basingstoke and Deane